Alderley Edge railway station serves the large village of Alderley Edge in Cheshire, England. The station is 13¾ miles (22 km) south of Manchester Piccadilly on the Crewe to Manchester Line.

History

Opened by the Manchester and Birmingham Railway, then absorbed by the London and North Western Railway, it became part of the London, Midland and Scottish Railway during the grouping of 1923. The line then passed on to the London Midland Region of British Railways on nationalisation in 1948.

When sectorisation was introduced, the station was served by Regional Railways on behalf of the Greater Manchester Passenger Transport Executive until the privatisation of British Railways.

The line was electrified in 1960 (as the first stage of the West Coast Main Line electrification project) - since then, the station has acted as a terminus for some local services from the Manchester direction. Both platforms are bi-directionally signalled to facilitate this and there are turnback sidings provided close to the station to allow empty stock to be stabled clear of the main line.

Station layout 
Alderley Edge station has two platforms, both of which have a small station building. The building on platform 1 has a wooden canopy and houses a waiting area and ticket office, but on platform 2 the building is not open to the public. The two platforms are connected by a footbridge and an adjacent road bridge at the southern end of the station. There are two ticket machines on the western side of the station, accessible from platform 1.

Vehicle access is available to the western side of the station but only for drop-off purposes; for longer stays a car park is provided to the east.

Services

Northern 
The basic weekday service pattern is:
 Four trains per hour towards Manchester Piccadilly
 One train per hour to Manchester Piccadilly starting from here.
 One train per hour runs via the Styal Line, calling at Wilmslow, Styal, Manchester Airport, Heald Green, Gatley, East Didsbury, Burnage and Mauldeth Road, then continues to Liverpool Lime Street via Chat Moss
 One train per hour runs via the Stockport route, calling at Wilmslow, Handforth, Cheadle Hulme, Stockport and Heaton Chapel, and terminates at Piccadilly.
 One train per hour runs via the same Stockport route, calling additionally at Levenshulme, then continues to Southport via Wigan Wallgate
 Two trains per hour to Crewe
 One starting from Manchester Piccadilly
 One starting from Liverpool Lime Street

Transport for Wales 
Transport for Wales operate a few services, on Sundays only:
 Two services to Manchester Piccadilly, one of which using the little-used Manchester Airport bypass line (express from Wilmslow) and one calling at Wilmslow and Stockport.
 One service to Swansea in the morning
 One express service to Crewe

Notes

References 

 
 
 
 Station on navigable O.S. map

Further reading

External links

 Crewe-Manchester Community Rail Partnership

Former London and North Western Railway stations
Railway stations in Cheshire
DfT Category E stations
Railway stations in Great Britain opened in 1842
Northern franchise railway stations
Railway stations served by Transport for Wales Rail
1842 establishments in England